Michael Joseph Montelongo (born August 20, 1955, in New York City) was nominated by President George W. Bush as the Assistant Secretary of the Air Force for Financial Management.  He was formerly a Senior Project Manager with Cap Gemini Ernst & Young in Atlanta, Georgia, and has been with Ernst & Young since 1999.  He was previously Chief of Staff and Director of Small Business Services for BellSouth Telecommunications, Inc.  From 1995 to 1996, he was a Congressional Fellow in the office of Senator Kay Bailey Hutchison and, from 1994 to 1995, he served as Special Assistant to the Chief of Staff of the United States Army.  Hon. Montelongo served as Chief of Staff and General Manager of Operations General Management at Fort Bliss, Texas, from 1992 to 1994 and was a Senior Analyst and associate professor at the U.S. Military Academy at West Point, NY from 1988 to 1991.  He is a twenty-year veteran of the U.S. Army, a graduate of the U.S. Military Academy, and received an M.B.A. from Harvard Business School.

Brief Biography
Hon. Michael Montelongo was Assistant Secretary of the Air Force for Financial Management and Comptroller, Headquarters U.S. Air Force, Washington, D.C. He is also the principal adviser to the Secretary of the Air Force, Chief of Staff, and other senior Air Force officials for budgetary and fiscal matters. With a budget of more than $124 billion, he serves as the Air Force's Chief Financial Officer responsible for providing the financial management and analytical services necessary for the effective and efficient use of Air Force resources. He was sworn on August 6, 2001, as the 18th Assistant Secretary, and is the senior Hispanic official in the Air Force.

Mr. Montelongo entered public service in 1977 as a lieutenant in the U.S. Army, and completed the U.S. Army Ranger School at Fort Benning, Georgia in 1978. He then served in line and staff positions from platoon to Department of the Army levels at varied U.S. and overseas posts. An Air Defense Artillery Officer, he was Special Assistant to the Commander in Chief of United States Southern Command, Speechwriter and Special Assistant to the Army Chief of Staff, and a congressional fellow in the U.S. Senate. In 1996, he entered private industry with BellSouth Telecommunications, and later became a Sales Executive and Consultant with Cap Gemini Ernst & Young.

Mr. Montelongo has been active in several civic pursuits. These include serving as Vice President of Community Services for the Harvard Business School Club of Atlanta, on the board of directors for the Georgia Voter Hispanic Registration Campaign, and directing youth and young adult ministries for the Atlanta archdiocese. A New York City native from Puerto Rican descent, Mr. Montelongo is listed in Hispanic Business Magazine's "100 Most Influential Hispanics", in Hispanic Engineer Magazine's "50 Most Important Hispanics in Technology and Business," and in Hispanic Executive magazine's 2017 Best of the Boardroom. In 2016, Mr. Montelongo was recognized by the Alumni Society in the organization's Class of 2016.

Education
1973 Xavier High School, Manhattan, New York City, N.Y.
1977 Bachelor of Science degree in general engineering, U.S. Military Academy, West Point, N.Y.
1988 Master of business administration degree, Harvard Business School, Boston, Mass.
1992 U.S. Army Command and General Staff College, Fort Leavenworth, Kan.

Career Chronology
1977–1986, line and staff positions, U.S. and overseas posts
1988–1991, Senior Analyst and assistant professor, U.S. Military Academy, West Point, N.Y.
1992–1994, Battalion Operations and Executive Officer, and Brigade Operations Officer, Fort Bliss, Texas
1994–1995, Special Assistant to the Army Chief of Staff, the Pentagon, Washington, D.C.
1995–1996, congressional fellow, 104th Congress, Washington, D.C.
1996–1998, Director, Small Business Services, BellSouth Telecommunications Inc., Atlanta, Ga.
1999–2001, Sales Executive and Consultant, Cap Gemini Ernst and Young, U.S. LLC, Atlanta, Ga.
2001–2005, Assistant Secretary of the Air Force for Financial Management and Comptroller, Headquarters U.S. Air Force, Washington, D.C.

Professional Memberships and Associations
American Society of Military Comptrollers
Minority Outreach Committee, Association of West Point Graduates
National Society of Hispanic MBAs

See also

List of Puerto Ricans

References

White House Nomination

|-

1955 births
Living people
Xavier High School (New York City) alumni
United States Military Academy alumni
Military personnel from New York City
Puerto Rican Army personnel
Puerto Rican military officers
United States Army officers
Harvard Business School alumni
United States Military Academy faculty
American politicians of Puerto Rican descent
George W. Bush administration personnel
New York (state) Republicans